The Courreges Zooop was a three-seat electric concept car built in 2006 by the Paris-based fashion house Maison de Courrèges.

The car was not produced for a car manufacturer, but by the fashion design house Maison de Courrèges, which did not promote the car outside of France.

References

Production electric cars
Cars of France